Pan-STARRS is the Panoramic Survey Telescope and Rapid Response System in Hawaii, United States

Objects discovered by Pan-STARRS include
 Comets
 C/2011 L4
 2012: C/2012 K1, C/2012 S4
 2013: 311P/PANSTARRS
 2014: C/2014 G3, C/2014 Q1 (PANSTARRS), C/2014 OG392 (PANSTARRS)
 C/2015 ER61 (PANSTARRS)
 C/2016 R2 (PANSTARRS)
 C/2017 K2
 C/2018 F4 (PANSTARRS)
 C/2021 O3
 Interstellar asteroid
 ʻOumuamua (1I/2017 U1)

Pan-STARRS